Ada Lovelace, also referred to simply as Lovelace, is the codename for a graphics processing unit (GPU) microarchitecture developed by Nvidia as the successor to the Ampere architecture, officially announced on September 20, 2022. It is named after English mathematician Ada Lovelace who is often regarded as the first computer programmer and is the first architecture to include both a first and last name. Nvidia announced the architecture along with the new GeForce 40 series consumer GPUs and the RTX 6000 Ada Generation pro workstation graphics card. The new GPUs were revealed to use TSMC's new 5 nm "4N" process which offers increased efficiency over the previous Samsung 8 nm and TSMC N7 processes used by Nvidia for its last generation Ampere architecture.

Details 
Architectural improvements of the Ada Lovelace architecture include the following:
 CUDA Compute Capability 8.9
 TSMC 4Nprocess (custom designed for NVIDIA) - not to be confused with TSMC's regular N4 node
 4th-generation Tensor Cores with FP8, FP16, bfloat16, TensorFloat-32 (TF32) and sparsity acceleration
 3rd-generation Ray Tracing Cores, plus concurrent ray tracing and shading and compute
 Shader Execution Reordering (SER)
 Nvidia video encoder/decoder (NVENC/NVDEC) with 8K 10-bit 60FPS AV1 fixed function hardware encoding
 No NVLink support

Chips 
 AD102
 AD103
 AD104
 AD106
 AD107

Products using Ada Lovelace 
 GeForce 40 series
 GeForce RTX 4050 (mobile) (AD107)
 GeForce RTX 4060 (mobile) (AD107)
 GeForce RTX 4070 (mobile) (AD106)
 GeForce RTX 4070 Ti (AD104)
 GeForce RTX 4080 (mobile) (AD104)
 GeForce RTX 4080 (AD103)
 GeForce RTX 4090 (mobile) (AD103)
 GeForce RTX 4090 (AD102)

 Nvidia Workstation GPUs (formerly Quadro)
 Nvidia RTX 6000 Ada Generation (AD102)

 Nvidia Data Center GPUs (formerly Tesla)
 Nvidia L40 (AD102)

See also 

 List of eponyms of Nvidia GPU microarchitectures

References 

Nvidia microarchitectures
Nvidia Ada Lovelace